The Peoria Rivermen were an ice hockey team that played in the International Hockey League. They played in Peoria, Illinois at the Carver Arena.  A new team with the Peoria Rivermen name currently competes in the Southern Professional Hockey League.

History
The Peoria Rivermen were founded in 1982–83 in the International Hockey League, operating under owner Ken Wilson as the Peoria Prancers. The franchise was taken over by the Peoria Civic Center in 1984, which held a contest with the Peoria Journal Star newspaper to rename the team with Rivermen as the winner. The IHL's Peoria Rivermen began operations for the 1984–85 season and won the Turner Cup in their first season. They were bought by Bruce Saurs in the summer of 1989, and he owned the club for 19 seasons. Following several season of financial losses, Saurs sold 50% of the ownership in the IHL franchise in 1996 and relocated it as the San Antonio Dragons. Saurs then launched the Rivermen in the East Coast Hockey League (ECHL) beginning with the 1996–97 season.

They held professional hockey's longest winning streak at 18 games in 1991 until the Norfolk Admirals of the American Hockey League broke the record by winning 28 consecutive games in 2012.

Former owner Bruce Saurs died in July 2014.

References

External links
The Internet Hockey Database - Peoria Rivermen

Defunct ice hockey teams in Illinois
Peoria Rivermen
St. Louis Blues minor league affiliates
New York Islanders minor league affiliates
1982 establishments in Illinois
Ice hockey clubs established in 1982
1996 disestablishments in Illinois
Ice hockey teams in Illinois
Sports clubs disestablished in 1996
Calgary Flames minor league affiliates